Southern Image (foaled April 7, 2000) is a millionaire American Thoroughbred racehorse and successful sire. He was bred in Florida by Arthur I. Appleton   He finished racing with a record of 6-1-1 in 8 starts and earnings of $1,843,750.  Southern Image was best known for his 2004 wins in the grade one Pimlico Special and the grade one Santa Anita Handicap which made him the third ever to win both prestigious races on separate coasts of the United States. The others were Farma Way and Seabiscuit. He also won the Florida/California Sunshine Millions Classic and the grade 1 Malibu Stakes.

Two-year-old season 

Southern Image was sold as a two-year-old for $300,000, the second-highest-priced horse at the Ocala Breeders' Sale in March 2003 two-year-old in training sale. He raced only once late in his two year season and won a maiden special weight race at six and a half furlongs at Santa Anita Park by three lengths. He earned $28,800.

Three-year-old season 

At age three, Southern Image started the season with a third-place finish in a Triple Crown prep race to Breeders' Cup Juvenile runner-up Kafwain in the $150,000 grade two San Vicente Stakes at Santa Anita. During that race, he sustained a slight injury and had to be rested over the next five months. He came back to the track and won an allowance race in August 2003 at eight and a half furlongs at Del Mar Racetrack. In December, Southern Image scored his biggest victory of the year in the $250,000 grade two Malibu Stakes at seven furlongs at Santa Anita over Midas Eyes. He finished the year with a record of (3): 2-0-1 and earnings of $202,800.

Four-year-old season 

In January 2004, Southern Image won the $1,000,000 stakes called the Sunshine Millions Classic at nine furlongs at Santa Anita by three lengths over Excess Summer and The Judge Sez Who. In March, he won the $1,000,000 grade one Santa Anita Handicap at ten furlongs at Santa Anita Park in a time of 2:01.64 over Island Fashion and Saint Buddy.

In May, Southern Image was shipped 3,000 miles east to run in the $600,000 grade one Pimlico Special at "Old Hilltop" in Baltimore, Maryland. He came into the Special off four straight victories at Santa Anita. The field was depleted on race day by the scratch of dual classic winner Funny Cide. The race also included the Preakness Stakes runner-up Midway Road, grade one winner Evening Attire, graded stakes winner Bowman's Band, and Dynever, who finished third in the prior year's Breeders' Cup Classic.

Southern Image went off as the favorite at 9-5 because of his "Big Cap" score. He broke well and assumed the lead passing the stands for the first time. Going around the famous club house turn at Pimlico Race Course, jockey Victor Espinoza took hold. Throughout the backstretch and around the far turn in a 1/2 mile of :47, Southern Image sat back in second just off the right rear flank of leader Midway Road. At the top of the lane, he fought back a challenge from Bowman's Band and wore down the leader. He recorded a Beyer speed figure of 119 and a #1 on the Ragozian sheets and finished the mile and 3/16 race on dirt in 1:55.4, defeating runner-up Midway Road by 1-1/2 lengths, with third-place finisher Bowman's Band another 2 1/2 lengths behind them.

One month later, Southern Image finished second in the $800,000 grade one Stephen Foster Handicap at Churchill Downs. He lost to Colonial Colony by a nose and defeated multiple graded stakes winner Perfect Drift. He concluded his four-year-old season in 2004 with a record of (4): 3-1-0 and earnings of $1,612,150.

Retirement 

Southern Image stands at Taylor Made Farm in Nicholasville, Kentucky. He is also standing during the Southern Hemisphere season at Widden Stud, Australia, beginning in 2006.

Pedigree

References

2000 racehorse births
Racehorses bred in Florida
Racehorses trained in the United States
Thoroughbred family 13-c